Edgardo Ralph Romero Rivera (born December 9, 1957) is a Puerto Rican former professional baseball infielder and coach in Major League Baseball (MLB). He played for the Milwaukee Brewers, Boston Red Sox, Atlanta Braves, and Detroit Tigers. He was later a coach for the Houston Astros, and a manager for several Minor League Baseball teams. His son, Eddie, is an executive with the Red Sox.

Playing career

Milwaukee Brewers
Romero began his professional baseball career in the Milwaukee Brewers' minor league organization, playing for the Class A Burlington Bees in 1976. In 1977, he played for the Double-A Holyoke Millers and also made his MLB debut with the Brewers, appearing in 10 games with a .280 batting average. In 1978 and 1979, Romero played at the Triple-A level. He played with the Brewers during the 1980 to 1985 seasons, batting a career-high .317 in 1983, and appearing in a career-high 116 games in 1984. He played in one postseason game with the Brewers, during the 1981 American League Division Series against the New York Yankees, going 1-for-2 at the plate. Overall, in parts of eight seasons with Milwaukee, Romero batted .254 with five home runs and 102 RBIs in 426 games.

Boston Red Sox
Romero was traded by the Brewers to the Boston Red Sox in December 1985 in exchange for pitcher Mark Clear. Romero spent part of four seasons with the Red Sox (1986–1989), appearing in 219 games while batting .241 with two home runs and 42 RBIs. Boston release him in August 1989. While with Boston, he appeared in one game of the 1986 American League Championship Series, three games of the 1986 World Series, and one game of the 1988 American League Championship Series, going hitless in five at bats during those games.

Atlanta Braves
Romero signed with the Atlanta Braves and appeared in seven games with them in August 1989, batting .263 (5-for-19). In late August, Atlanta traded him to Milwaukee for a player to be named later (pitcher Jay Aldrich).

Return to Milwaukee Brewers
Romero appeared in 15 games with the Brewers in August and September 1989, batting .200 (10-for-50). After the season ended, he became a free agent.

Detroit Tigers
Romero signed with the Detroit Tigers in January 1990, and appeared in 32 games with the team, batting .229 (16-for-70). Detroit released him on July 15, 1990.

Late career
In 1991, Romero appeared in 28 games for the Triple-A Las Vegas Stars, a farm team of the San Diego Padres. He batted .229 (16-for-70) with the Stars.

Career totals
In 12 major league seasons, Romero played in 730 games while batting .247 (473-for-1912) with eight home runs and 155 RBIs. He appeared as a designated hitter and all defensive positions except for pitcher and catcher.

Post-playing career
Romero served as manager for several minor league teams, working within the Padres organization (1992–1996) and Milwaukee organization (1998, 2001–2002).

In 2007, Romero was named the Florida Marlins' minor league infield coordinator. He was the Houston Astros' third-base coach in 2008, and was their bench coach in 2009.

In 2010, Romero returned to managing in the minor leagues, working within the Astros organization. His most recent stint as a manager was with the Tri-City ValleyCats of the New York–Penn League for the 2013 to 2015 seasons.

Personal life
Romero's son, Eddie, is an executive with the Boston Red Sox; as of the 2019 season, his title is executive vice president and assistant general manager.

See also
 List of Major League Baseball players from Puerto Rico

References

External links

 Ed Romero (2006) on his Baseball Career via YouTube

1957 births
Living people
Atlanta Braves players
Boston Red Sox players
Burlington Bees players
Detroit Tigers players
Holyoke Millers players
Houston Astros coaches
Indianapolis Indians managers
Las Vegas Stars (baseball) players
Major League Baseball bench coaches
Major League Baseball players from Puerto Rico
Major League Baseball shortstops
Major League Baseball second basemen
Major League Baseball third basemen
Major League Baseball third base coaches
Milwaukee Brewers players
People from Wellington, Florida
Puerto Rican expatriate baseball players in Canada
Spokane Indians managers
Spokane Indians players
Sportspeople from San Juan, Puerto Rico
Vancouver Canadians players